Jayne Mansfield: Shakespeare, Tchaikovsky & Me is a novelty album by actress, model and Playmate Jayne Mansfield in 1964. She recited Shakespeare's sonnets and poems by Marlowe, Browning, Wordsworth, Herrick, and others against a background of Tchaikovsky's music  for the album. The album cover depicted a bouffant-coiffed Mansfield with lips pursed and breasts barely covered by a fur stole, posing between busts of the Russian composer and the Bard of Avon.

The New York Times described the album as the actress reading "30-odd poems in a husky, urban, baby voice". The paper's reviewer went on to state that "Miss Mansfield is a lady with apparent charms, but reading poetry is not one of them."

Tracks
 "How Do I Love Thee" - 1:48
 "The Indian Serenade" - 1:01
 "Goodnight" - 0:40
 "You Say I Love Not" - 0:52
 "If This Be Love" - 0:49
 "The Lady's Yes" - 1:14
 "She Walks In Beauty" - 0:55
 "Cleopatra" - 1:50
 "Was This The Face" - 1:02
 "Whiteness, Or Chastity" - 0:47
 "Madrigal" - 0:20
 "Jenny Kiss'd Me" - 0:40
 "Verses Copied From The Window Of An Obscure Lodging House" - 1:09
 "The Enchantment" - 0:37
 "The Passionate Sheperd To His Love" - 1:01
 "Upon The Nipples Of Julia's Breast" - 0:33
 "Drink To Me Only With Thine Eyes" - 1:04
 "The Lovers" - 1:45
 "To The Virgins, To Make Much Of Time" - 0:44
 "Inclusions" - 0:53
 "When You Are Old" - 0:51
 "Daffodils" - 0:58
 "Take, O, Take Those Lips Away" - 0:19
 "Mark How The Bashful Morn" - 0:55
 "Oh! Dear, What Can The Matter Be?" - 0:44
 "The Miller's Daughter" - 0:45
 "The Fire Of Love" - 0:43
 "The Constant Lover" - 0:42
 "Why Should A Foolish Marriage" - Vow 0:42
 "Believe Me, If All Those Endearing Young Charms" - 0:55
 "Love Me Little, Love Me Long" - 1:33

References

External links
 Review of the album

1964 albums
Jayne Mansfield albums
MGM Records albums
Spoken word albums by American artists